Crowley House may refer to:

 Crowley House (Thousand Oaks, California), Ventura County Historical Landmark 109
 Crowley House (Willcox, Arizona), listed on the National Register of Historic Places in Cochise County, Arizona
 Crowley House (North Adams, Massachusetts), listed on the NRHP in Massachusetts
Chase-Crowley-Keep House, Lockport, New York, listed on the NRHP in New York